Nina Marion Armagno (born March 20, 1966) is a United States Space Force lieutenant general who has served as the director of staff of the United States Space Force since 2020. She is the service's first female general officer and the only officer to have commanded both the 30th Space Wing and the 45th Space Wing. Before transferring to the Space Force, she was a major general in the United States Air Force, where she served for over 32 years.

Early life and education

Armagno was born in 1966 to Anthony and Naida Armagno. A native of Dundee, Illinois, she graduated from Dundee-Crown High School in 1984 where she was the class valedictorian and class president. She grew up in suburban Chicago.

Wanting to become an astronaut, Armagno received a Bachelor of Science degree from the United States Air Force Academy in Colorado Springs, Colorado in 1988. She graduated Squadron Officer School in 1992, at Maxwell Air Force Base in Alabama. She received a Master of Arts degree in 1999, in Education Administration and Management,  from Chapman University in California. She graduated from the Air Command and Staff College in 2000, by correspondence. In 2002, she participated in an Air Force Legislative Fellowship in Washington, D.C. In 2003, she received a certificate in Legislative Studies from Georgetown University in Washington, D.C. She graduated from the Air War College in 2003, by correspondence. In 2007, she received a Master of Science degree, in National Security Studies, from the National War College in Washington, D.C. In 2010, she attended the United States Air Force Enterprise Leadership Seminar at the University of Virginia, Darden School of Business, in Virginia. Also in 2010, she attended the Leadership Development Program at the Center for Creative Leadership in Colorado Springs, Colorado.

Military service

Armagno entered the Air Force after graduating from the United States Air Force Academy, Colorado, in June 1988. Her experience in space systems operations includes combat mission ready operator, instructor, evaluator and flight commander in strategic missile warning, space surveillance, space control, space launch and theater missile warning mission areas. She was the operations officer at the 1st Space Launch Squadron, Cape Canaveral Air Force Station, Florida.

Armagno served as second Commander, 30th Space Wing, Vandenberg Air Force Base, California, responsible for space lift and range operations, and support of operational and developmental missile system testing for the Department of Defense from the West Coast of the United States. She has served as the installation commander of the 6th Space Warning Squadron at Cape Cod Air Force Station, Massachusetts, the commander and deputy commander, 21st Operations Group, Peterson Air Force Base, Colorado, as the Department of Defense senior military assistant and chief of staff to the director, Operational Test and Evaluation, Office of the Secretary of Defense. In addition, she has held staff assignments at Headquarters U.S. Air Force, Headquarters Air Force Space Command, Headquarters 14th Air Force and the 381st Training Group and served as an Air Force Legislative Fellow in the office of Congresswoman Ellen Tauscher.

On June 12, 2013, Armagno was promoted to brigadier general and took command of the 45th Space Wing and director of the Eastern Range at Patrick Air Force Base, Florida. She also became the first officer to command both the 30th Space Wing and the 45th Space Wing. There, she was responsible for the processing and launching of U.S. government and commercial satellites from Cape Canaveral Air Force Station, Florida. She was also the final approval authority for all launches on the Eastern Range, a 15-million-square-mile area which supports an average of 15 launches per year aboard Delta, Atlas, Falcon, Navy, and emerging launch vehicles. In addition, she managed wing launch and range infrastructure supporting NASA, commercial, and missile test missions.

Armagno relinquished command of the 45th Space Wing to Wayne Monteith on August 4, 2015, and was assigned as the director of strategic plans, programs, requirements, and analysis of the Air Force Space Command, where she was responsible for developing strategy, doctrine, and policy for the command's space and cyberspace operations, defining the future of space and cyberspace systems through requirements definition, mission area architectures, analysis, science and technology development in support of the joint warfighter, Department of Defense, civil, and national users.

In June 2017, Armagno was reassigned as director of plans and policy at the United States Strategic Command. She stayed there for a year before getting reassigned to the Pentagon to serve as the director for space programs at the Office of the Assistant Secretary for Acquisition.

When the Space Force was established in 2019, Armagno was tapped by then-Lieutenant General David D. Thompson to help stand-up the new service, working as the S2/3/4/6/8/9/10 while still officially assigned as the director of space programs. She was nominated on July 28, 2020, for transfer to the United States Space Force and promotion to lieutenant general. She was also assigned to serve as its first director of staff. She transferred and was promoted on August 17, 2020, becoming the first female general officer in the Space Force.

Personal life
Armagno's husband is Eddie Papczun, a retired Air Force officer whom she met when they were both captains.

Awards and decorations

Dates of promotion

References

 

 
 

 
 

 

 
 

 
 

 
 

 

Living people
United States Air Force Academy alumni
Chapman University alumni
Georgetown University alumni
National War College alumni
Female generals of the United States Air Force
United States Space Force generals
Office of the Chief of Space Operations personnel
Lieutenant generals
Recipients of the Defense Distinguished Service Medal
Recipients of the Defense Superior Service Medal
Recipients of the Legion of Merit
1966 births
21st-century American women